Nanu may refer to:

People
 D. Nanu (1873–1943), Romanian poet
 Emil Nanu (born 1981), a Romanian football player, plays for FC Callatis Mangalia
 Florin Nanu (born 1983), a Romanian football player, plays for ACS Poli Timișoara
 Ștefan Nanu (born 1968), a former Romanian football player, now a coach
 Nanu Singh Saini, 18th century Sikh general
 Nanu (footballer) (born 1994), a Bissauguinean footballer, full name Eulânio Ângelo Chipela Gomes

Places
 Nanu, Iran, a village in Kerman Province, Iran
 Nanu River, a tributary of the Valea Pinului River in Romania

NANU
 National Academy of Sciences of Ukraine (Natsional’na akademiya nauk Ukrayiny) 
 Notice Advisory to NAVSTAR Users (NAVSTAR referring to the Global Positioning System)
 Namibia Nurses Union

Other uses
 Nānū or Mann's Gardenia (Gardenia mannii or Gardenia remyi), a species of flowering tree in the coffee family
 Nanu, a fictional character in Disney's 1973 film The World's Greatest Athlete
 the female polar bear in the 2007 Arctic Tale documentary film
Nanu, a character in the Pokémon games

See also
 Nanus (disambiguation)
 "Nanu nanu", a catchphrase of Mork's in the television show Mork & Mindy